The 2016 Antrim Senior Football Championship is the 115th official edition of Antrim GAA's premier club gaelic football tournament for senior clubs in County Antrim. The tournament consists of 12 teams with the winner representing Antrim in the Ulster Senior Club Football Championship. The championship has a straight knock-out format.

All Saints, St Brigid's and St Joseph's Glenavy returned to the senior championship in 2016.

Éire Óg Cargin were the defending champions after they defeated Lámh Dhearg 2–11 to 1–5 in the 2015 final. They successfully defended their title to claim a "2-in-a-row" of championships on 16 October 2016 at Corrigan Park when defeating St Gall's on a scoreline of 1–10 to 0–6.

Promoted to SFC from IFC in 2015
 St Joseph's Glenavy  -  (IFC Champions)
 All Saints 
 St Brigid's

Relegated from SFC to IFC in 2015
 St James' Aldergrove
 St Paul's

Round 1
8 of the 12 senior clubs play in this round. The 4 winners proceed to the quarter-finals to play the 4 teams who received byes in Round 1. The 4 losers exit the championship.

 Creggan Kickhams 1-16, 1-9 St Mary's Ahoghill, Moneyglass, 12/8/2016,
 All Saints 1-14, 0-10 St Teresa's, Ahoghill, 14/8/2016,
 Roger Casement's Portglenone 1-11, 1-9 St Joseph's Glenavy, Ahoghill, 14/8/2016,
 O'Donovan Rossa 1-16, 1-13 St Brigid's, Hannahstown, 14/8/2016,

Quarter-finals
The 4 Round 1 winners play the 4 teams who received byes in Round 1.

 St John's 1-10, 0-6 All Saints Ballymena, Ahoghill, 2/9/2016,
 Erin's Own Cargin 2–9, 1-12 Creggan Kickhams, Ahoghill, 2/9/2016,
 Lámh Dhearg 0–12, 1-9 O'Donovan Rossa, Corrigan Park, 3/9/2016,
 St Gall's 0-15, 0-11 Roger Casement's Portglenone, Corrigan Park, 3/9/2016,
 Erin's Own Cargin 2-10, 0-10 Creggan Kickhams, Ahoghill, 10/9/2016, (Replay)
 Lámh Dhearg 2-12, 2-6 O'Donovan Rossa, Corrigan Park, 24/9/2016, (Replay)

Semi-finals

 Erin's Own Cargin 1-21 2-12 St John's, Glenavy, 2/10/2016
 St Gall's 1-7 0-8 Lámh Dhearg, Ahoghill, 5/10/2016

Final

Championship Bracket

Ulster Senior Club Football Championship

References

Antrim Senior Football Championship
Antrim Senior Football Championship